Gedore or Gedore Tool Group , is a tool-making company founded in 1919 as Gedore Werkzeugfabrik Otto Dowidat KG by the three Dowidat brothers, Otto, Karl and Willi, who started the manufacture of hand tools for industry from their hometown of Remscheid in Germany. The company name "GE-DO-RE" is an acronym of "GEbrüder DOwidat REmscheid". 

In 1949 Willi left the firm, and with Karl's death in 1933, Otto became the sole owner. The factory having escaped damage during World War II, rapid growth followed. In the 1960s the company began a policy of investing abroad and has since grown into a global organisation with manufacturing operations in Germany, Austria, the United Kingdom, Turkey, Brazil and South Africa. 

In 1972 Gedore acquired Richard Abraham Herder Solingen or Rahsol, thereby expanding into the steel goods market.

External links
Gedore Homepage

Tool manufacturing companies of Germany
Companies based in North Rhine-Westphalia
German brands
Automotive tool manufacturers